Garret is a given name. It is an alternate spelling of Garrett. Notable people with the given name include:

Garret Anderson (born 1972), American former professional baseball left fielder
Garret Dillahunt (born 1964), American actor
Garret Ross (born 1992), American professional ice hockey player
Garret Graves (born 1972), the United States representative from Louisiana's 6th congressional district
Garret Chachere (born 1969), American football coach
Garret Pettis (born 1989), a retired American soccer player who recently played for Harrisburg City Islanders
Garret FitzGerald (1926–2011), Irish Fine Gael politician 
Garret Siler (born 1986), American professional basketball player
Garret Sparks (born 1993), American professional ice hockey goaltender 
Garret Hobart (1844–1899), the 24th Vice President of the United States
Garret Chachere (born 1969), American football coach and former player
Garret D. Wall (1783–1850), a military officer and politician
Garret Wallow (born 1999), American football player
Garret Wesley, 1st Earl of Mornington (1735–1781)
Garret Wellesley, 7th Earl Cowley (1934–2016)

See also
Garratt (surname)
Garet (disambiguation) – people
Garrett (disambiguation)
Garrett (name) – history of the name
Jarrett (surname)